Elvir Melunović (born 17 July 1979 in SFR Yugoslavia) is a Swiss football player. He currently plays for Sportfreunde Siegen.

External links

1981 births
Living people
Swiss men's footballers
Swiss expatriate footballers
Switzerland under-21 international footballers
Swiss Super League players
Grasshopper Club Zürich players
FC Aarau players
Neuchâtel Xamax FCS players
Servette FC players
BSC Young Boys players
FC Schaffhausen players
FC Wil players
A.S. Sambenedettese players
Sportfreunde Siegen players
Expatriate footballers in Italy
Expatriate footballers in Germany
Place of birth missing (living people)
Yugoslav emigrants to Switzerland
Swiss people of Serbian descent
Association football midfielders